The Good Lie is a 2014 American drama film written by Margaret Nagle and directed by Philippe Falardeau. The film stars Reese Witherspoon in the lead role, Arnold Oceng, Ger Duany, Emmanuel Jal, and Corey Stoll.

The Good Lie was screened in the Special Presentations section of the 2014 Toronto International Film Festival before being released on October 3, 2014. Another major screening was held by the Greenwich International Film Festival on October 22, 2014, for the benefit of the U.S. Fund for UNICEF.

Plot
During the Second Sudanese Civil War, siblings Mamere, Paul, Jeremiah, Theo, Daniel, and Abital escape after their families and village are massacred. After numerous days of walking in the wilderness, they join a group of refugees but have to leave after they are caught by enemy soldiers and many people are killed. After sleeping in the grassland, Mamere wakes up and spots two enemy soldiers approaching them. Theo hides the rest of the siblings in the grass and lies to the soldiers that he is alone. He is taken in custody with the soldiers. The group eventually arrives at a Sudanese refugee camp in Nairobi, Kenya, where Daniel succumbs to disease and dies. Thirteen years later, among the thousands in the camp, the siblings win for relocation to the United States.

On arrival in New York City, Abital is unexpectedly told that she is to leave for Boston, where a family awaits. As their sister tearfully leaves, Jeremiah, Mamere and Paul board the flight to Kansas City, where they meet Carrie Davis, a brash employment counselor, who helps them find jobs, and Pamela, who provides them their house and support. Jeremiah works at a grocery store and teaches Sunday school at a local church, but later quits the job because he was caught giving old food to a homeless person rather than throwing it away. Paul works at a factory and makes friends with his co-workers, where he is exposed to drugs. Mamere takes two jobs as a store clerk and a security guard to pay for schooling, as he aspires to become a medical doctor. Mamere eventually convinces Carrie to help them bring back Abital; on Christmas Eve, Carrie arrives at their home with Abital and the Lost Boys of Sudan celebrate their birthday on January 1, as they had never known the date when they were born.

Abital receives an anonymous letter stating that someone entered the refugee camp in Kenya searching for the group. Thinking it is Theo, Mamere travels to Nairobi and searches the refugee camp after they tell him that Theo is not registered. After meeting James, an old friend, he is reunited with Theo the next day. Mamere tries to get immigration papers to multiple embassies and fails, but tells Theo that the "task" was done. At the airport, Mamere reveals to Theo that he could not get him a passport and instead gives Theo his own passport - a deception that is the 'good lie'. After a tearful farewell, Theo leaves and is embraced by his family upon arrival in the United States; Mamere remains in Kenya and works at the camp hospital.

Cast
 Reese Witherspoon as Carrie Davis
 Ger Duany as Jeremiah
 Arnold Oceng as Mamere
 Emmanuel Jal as Paul
 Kuoth Wiel as Abital
 Femi Oguns as Theo
 Corey Stoll as Jack
 Sarah Baker as Pamela
 Mike Pniewski as Nick
 Thad Luckinbill as Matt

Reception
On Rotten Tomatoes, the film has an approval rating of 87% based on 86 reviews and an average rating of 6.7/10. The website's critical consensus reads, "The Good Lie sacrifices real-life nuance in order to turn its true story into a Hollywood production, but the results still add up to a compelling, well-acted, and deeply moving drama." On Metacritic, the film has a score of 65 out of 100 based on 30 critics, indicating "generally favorable reviews" from critics. Audiences polled by CinemaScore gave the film a rare average grade of "A+" on an A+ to F scale.

Margaret Nagle won the Writers Guild of America Paul Selvin Award for her script to this film.

Copyright and fraud lawsuit
In February 2015, the Foundation for Lost Boys and Girls of Sudan, Inc., acting on behalf of 54 Sudanese refugees, filed a lawsuit in Georgia against writer Margaret Nagle, Alcon Entertainment and Imagine Entertainment. The suit claimed that the refugees were joint authors of the stories they had told Nagle in interviews that she had recorded and used to write the story. It also asserted that a joint venture agreement had been breached, with fraud and other issues arising from a promise of compensation from a producer.

The US District Judge initially granted the defendants' motion to dismiss but allowed the suit to be refiled if the plaintiffs subsequently and successfully registered copyright of the interviews.

The court ultimately found that the refugees' statements supported the finding of copyright infringement and a permanent injunction on the movie. Before the case could be concluded, however, the plaintiffs' claims were settled out of court.

See also
 Lost Boys of Sudan
 Forced displacement in popular culture

References

External links
 
 
 
 
 
 
 
 

2014 films
2014 drama films
American drama films
2010s English-language films
English-language Indian films
Films scored by Trevor Rabin
Films set in Sudan
Films shot in Atlanta
Films shot in South Africa
Alcon Entertainment films
Black Label Media films
Reliance Entertainment films
Imagine Entertainment films
Warner Bros. films
Films directed by Philippe Falardeau
Films about brothers
Films about immigration to the United States
2010s American films